The 111 Squadron "Jaeger" was formed when the Republic of Singapore Air Force acquired four Grumman E-2C Hawkeye Airborne Early Warning aircraft in 1987. Based at Tengah Air Base, its primary function is to perform airborne surveillance and early warning. Other functions include Aircraft Intercept Control, Surface Surveillance, Search and Rescue and Air Traffic Control.

The unit is represented by the Jaeger, a vigilant and courageous hawk-like bird whose vigilance is aptly reflected in their motto "Vigilance in Control".

History
Since the early 1990s, as one of the signatory members of Five Power Defence Arrangements (FPDA), Singapore has regularly deployed the squadron's Hawkeye to participate in the air exercise part of the Integrated Air Defence System (IADS) phase.

Overview
In 2001, RSAF working together with the Defence Science and Technology Agency (DSTA) upgraded the entire computer and software systems of the E-2C. State-of-the-art equipment was adapted to the harsh military environment and millions of lines of code were rewritten. Interfaces between the various E-2C subsystems were also designed and enhanced.

The RSAF acquired four Gulfstream G550 jets with the IAI EL/W-2085 Active Electronically Scanned Array (AESA) dual-band phased array radar (a newer derivative of the Phalcon system) for CAEW duties from Israel Aerospace Industries (IAI) in 2007, at least 2 aircraft were delivered in late 2008 and are expected to be fully operational by 2010. Not included in the deal is an additional G550 as an AEW trainer, which will be acquired and maintained by ST Aerospace on behalf of RSAF.

During the 2010 Singapore Airshow, the squadron unveiled the new aircraft, which had been further upgraded, at the display pavilion.

Aircraft operated
4× E-2C Hawkeyes (USN BuNos 162793/162796, RSAF serials 011/012/014/015, 1987–2010s)
4× G550 CAEW (2008–present)

References

External links
RSAF web page on 111 Sqn & Tengah Air Base (TAB)

Video links

Squadrons of the Republic of Singapore Air Force
Tengah